Béla Ormos (born Béla Spitzer; 1 March 1899 – 13 April 1945) was a Hungarian actor. He was active in theatre and film between 1920 and 1939. A Jew, he was called up for labour service following the German occupation of Hungary and died in Mauthausen concentration camp weeks before the end of the Second World War.

Selected filmography
Iza néni (1933)

References

External links

1899 births
1945 deaths
Male actors from Budapest
Hungarian male stage actors
Hungarian male film actors
20th-century Hungarian male actors
Hungarian civilians killed in World War II
Hungarian Jews who died in the Holocaust
Hungarian people who died in Nazi concentration camps
People who died in Mauthausen concentration camp
Hungarian World War II forced labourers